Onde Nascem os Fortes (English title: Land of the Strong) is a Brazilian telenovela produced and broadcast by TV Globo, that debuted on 23 April 2018, and ended its run of 53 episodes on 16 July 2018. It is created by George Moura and Sergio Goldenberg. Walter Carvalho, Isabella Teixeira, José Luiz Villamarim, Fabiana Winits and Luisa Lima serve as the main directors. It is the second series announced and displayed as "superseries" — a dramatic plot similar to that of telenovelas, but with a standard and mature format. The format was  first employed with the launch of Os Dias Eram Assim.

After the disappearance of Nonato (Marco Pigossi), after a fight with the powerful Pedro Gouveia, played by Alexandre Nero. The twin sister of Nonato, Maria, played by Alice Wegmann, begins the search for her brother.

Premise
Twins Maria and Nonato decide to make a bike trail in the village where their mother, Cássia, lived in her youth and decided not to return. One night, Nonato tries to seduce Joana, a lover of the businessman Pedro Gouveia, who jealously takes him to the thickets to teach him a lesson. Nonato disappears mysteriously without a trail. Maria has been involved with Pedro's son, Hermano, for quite some time. With the help of Ramiro, who has a strong rivalry with Pedro, Cássia returns to Sertão in search of her missing son and daughter. Maria now a fugitive, after killing a man who tried to sexually assault her.

Cast
 Alice Wegmann as Maria Ferreira da Silva
 Gabriel Leone as Hermano Gouveia 
 Patrícia Pillar as Cássia Ferreira da Silva
 Alexandre Nero as Pedro Gouveia
 Fábio Assunção as Ramiro Curió
 Débora Bloch as Rosinete Gouveia
 Irandhir Santos as Samir 
 Enrique Díaz as Plínio
 Lee Taylor as Simplício
 Carla Salle as Valquíria
 Maeve Jinkings as Joana
 Lara Tremouroux as Aurora Gouvea
 Camila Márdila as Aldina
 José Dumont as Sebastião (Tião das Cacimbas)
 Demick Lopes as Mudinho
 Antônio Fábio as Orlando
 Ênio Cavalcante as Toinho
 Erivaldo Oliveira as Adenilson
 Ravel Andrade as Clécio
 Clarissa Pinheiro as Gilvânia
 Marcos de Andrade as Agripino Gogó 
 Rodrigo García as Jurandir
 Bruno Goya as Orestes
 Nanego Lira as Adauto
 Giordano Castro as Macedo
 Igor Medeiros as Fabrício
 Maycon Douglas as Ariel
 Mário Cabral as Jonathan
 Pedro Fasanaro as Valdir
 Pedro Wagner as Damião
 Quitéria Kelly as Umbelina
 Raquel Ferreira as Ivonete
 Arilson Lopes as Clementino
 Fernanda Marques as Selma
 Ilya São Paulo as Vitório

Guest cast
 Marco Pigossi as Nonato Ferreira da Silva
 Jesuíta Barbosa as Ramirinho Curió Jr / Shakira do Sertão
 Titina Medeiros as Bethânia
 Mariana Molina as Madalena

References

External links
  
 

2018 telenovelas
TV Globo telenovelas
Brazilian telenovelas
2018 Brazilian television series debuts
2018 Brazilian television series endings
Brazilian LGBT-related television shows
Lesbian-related television shows
Portuguese-language telenovelas